Amt Putlitz-Berge is an Amt ("collective municipality") in the district of Prignitz, in Brandenburg, Germany. Its seat is in Putlitz.

The Amt Putlitz-Berge consists of the following municipalities:
Berge
Gülitz-Reetz
Pirow
Putlitz
Triglitz

Demography

References

Putlitz-Berge
Prignitz